Waldemar Govinda Torenstra (born 29 March 1974 in Amsterdam) is a Dutch actor. For several years he worked as an actor in the Noord Nederlands Toneel (NNT, En: "North Netherlands Stage"), a touring theater company.

Career
After finishing his secondary education, Torenstra enrolled at the University of Amsterdam to study economics, but eventually chose theater instead.  In 1999, he graduated from the Amsterdam Theater School.

At the Noord Nederlands Toneel Torenstra acted in productions of Sympathy for the Devil (main character), Othello (Cassio), and Lenny Bruce.  In the fall of 2006, he played the leading role in a production of Moordspel ("Murder Game").

From 2012 to 2014, he served as the head of the jury for ShortCutz Amsterdam, an annual film festival promoting short films in Amsterdam.

In 2015, Torenstra played the role of Nick Roest in Vechtershart (Fighting Spirit), a series about a former kickboxing champion making his way back to the top after a prison sentence abroad. A second season was aired in 2017.

Personal life
Torenstra got engaged to Sophie Hilbrand in December 2018.

Trivia
Torenstra is an avid beekeeper and an activist for the protection of bees.

Roles and filmography

TV series
 Vechtershart (2015–present) 
 Divorce (2012) - Joris
 Lijn 32 (2012) - Hein van Vlijmen
 Mixed Up (Verandering, 2011) - David Vogel
 Grijpstra & De Gier (2007) - Rinus de Gier
 Lieve Lust (2005) - Andy
 De Band (2005) - Sven ten Bokel
 Onderweg naar Morgen (1999) - Charles van Zuydwerk Beemster
 Goede tijden, slechte tijden (1997) - Harry

Films
 My Granpa, the Bankrobber (Mijn opa de bankrover, 2011) - Teun
 The Happy Housewife (De gelukkige huisvrouw, 2010) - Harry
 Bride Flight (2008) - Frank
 Summer Heat (Zomerhitte, 2008) - Bob Griffioen
 Julia's Tango (2008) - Jeroen
 Yes Nurse! No Nurse! (Ja Zuster, Nee Zuster, 2002) - Gerrit
 Singel 39 - Max
 Huisvrouwen bestaan niet - Thijs 
 Amsterdam Vice (Baantjer: Het Begin, 2019) - Jurre de Cock
 Zwanger & Co (2022)

References

External links

1974 births
Living people
Dutch male actors
Dutch male stage actors
Dutch male film actors
Male actors from Amsterdam
21st-century Dutch male actors